Kathmandu View Tower is a building, currently under construction, in Kathmandu, Nepal. It is planned to be Nepal's tallest building at 29-stories.

It was inaugurated by Nepal's Vice-president Nanda Bahadur Pun on 11 November 2015. Construction on Kathmandu View Tower commenced on 14 August 2016.

In 2020, it was reported that only 15 percent of work on the building had been completed.

References 

Towers in Kathmandu

Tourist attractions in Kathmandu